NGC 5253 is an irregular galaxy in the constellation Centaurus. It was discovered by William Herschel on 15 March 1787.

Properties
NGC 5253 is located within the M83 Subgroup of the Centaurus A/M83 Group, a relatively nearby galaxy group that includes the radio galaxy Centaurus A and the spiral galaxy M83 (the Southern Pinwheel Galaxy).

NGC 5253 is considered a dwarf starburst galaxy and also a blue compact galaxy. Supernova 1972E, the second-brightest recent supernova visible from Earth (peak visual magnitude of 8.5, fainter only than SN 1987A in the 20th century), occurred in this galaxy.  Another supernova, SN 1895b, also has been recorded in the galaxy.

Contents
NGC 5253 contains a giant dust cloud hiding a cluster (believed to be a super star cluster) of more than one million stars, among them up to 7,000 O-type stars. The cluster is 3 million years old and has a total luminosity of more than one billion suns. It is the site of efficient star formation, with a rate at least 10 times higher than comparable regions in the Milky Way.

References

External links
 

17870315
Irregular galaxies
Peculiar galaxies
Centaurus A/M83 Group
Centaurus (constellation)
5253
48334
UGCA objects